Nándor Fa is a Hungarian yachtsman, born on 9 July 1953 in Székesfehérvár (Hungary).

Biography

He first followed the family tradition from an early age and practiced wrestling but an injury forced him to change sports. This sports enthusiast then discovers kayaking and then sailing at the age of 27 years old. Passionate about the he joined the Hungarian national team sailing the Finn and Laser dinghy he also started to draw boats. As he cruised near Cape Horn on the 31-foot course he had built, He learned on Chilean radio that a solo round-the-world race with stopovers was passing by: the BOC Challenge this inspired him to want to participate.

He sailed around the world in 700 days with Jozsef Gal between 1985 and 1987 on the ship Szent Jupat, which they built between 1981 and 1984.

Between 1988 and 1990 he built another boat, Alba Regia on which he participated in the BOC Challenge in 1990-1991 (10th in 165 days), then at the Vendée Globe in 1992-1993 (arrived 5th, after 128 days 16 hours 5 minutes and 4 seconds of racing).

He departed 1996–1997 Vendée Globe aboard Budapest, a new boat he built himself, but a keel damage and then a collision with a cargo ship quickly forced him to abandon2.

He came fourth in the 1997 Transat Jacques Vabre race 23 days 07 hours 12 minutes.

He participated in the 2016–2017 Vendée Globe on the boat Spirit of Hungary of which he is co-designer with Déry Attila although the boat was built by Pauger Composites in Hungary

Race result highlights

Career highlights

Gallery

References

External links 
 
 Official Facebook Page
 Official YouTube Channel
 Official Twitter Feed

1953 births
Living people
IMOCA 60 class sailors
Hungarian male sailors (sport)
Vendée Globe finishers
1992 Vendee Globe sailors
1996 Vendee Globe sailors
2016 Vendee Globe sailors
Hungarian Vendee Globe sailors
Single-handed circumnavigating sailors
Sportspeople from Székesfehérvár